Lirapex costellatus is a species of sea snail, a marine gastropod mollusk in the family Peltospiridae.

Description
The length of the shell attains 3.6 mm. Lirapex costellatus form shallow marine sediments. It is a chemosymbiotroph. It has sexual reproduction.

Distribution
This marine species occurs on the Mid-Atlantic Ridge at a depth of 685 m.

References

Peltospiridae
Gastropods described in 2001